Álvaro de Campos (October 15, 1890 – November 30, 1935) was one of the poet Fernando Pessoa's various heteronyms, widely known by his powerful and wrathful writing style. According to his author, this alter ego was born in Tavira, Portugal, studied mechanical engineering and finally graduated in ship engineering in Glasgow. After a journey in Ireland, Campos sailed to the Orient and wrote his poem "Opiario" in the Suez Canal "onboard". He worked in 'Barrow-on-Furness' (sic) (of which Pessoa wrote a poem about) and Newcastle-on-Tyne (1922). Unemployed, Campos returned to Lisbon in 1926 (he wrote then the poem "Lisbon Revisited"), where he lived ever since. He was born in October, 1890, but Pessoa didn't put an end to the life of Campos, so he would have survived his author who died in November, 1935. Campos' works may be split in three phases: the decadent phase, the futuristic phase and the decadent (sad) phase. He chose Whitman and Marinetti as masters, showing some similarities with their works, mainly in the second phase: hymns like "Ode Triunfal", "Ode Marítima",  and "Ultimatum" praise the power of the rising technology, the strength of the machines, the dark side of the industrial civilization, and an enigmatic love for the machines. The first phase (marked by the poem Opiário) shared some of its pessimism with Pessoa's friend Mário de Sá-Carneiro, one of his co-workers in Orpheu magazine. In the last phase, Pessoa drops the mask, and reveals through Campos all the emptiness and nostalgia that grew during his last years of life.<ref>PESSOA, Fernando (1999). Crítica: ensaios, artigos e entrevistas, vol.I, ed. Fernando Cabral Martins. Lisboa: Assírio & Alvim, p. 189.</ref> In his last phase Campos wrote the poems "Lisbon Revisited" and the well-known "Tobacco Shop".

"I always want to be the thing I feel kinship with...
To feel everything in every way,
To hold all opinions,
To be sincere contradicting oneself every minute..."

Critical overview

"I'm nothing.
I'll always be nothing.
I can't want to be something.
'I have in me all the dreams of the world nevertheless."

"The Tobacco Shop"

Campos manifests two contrary impulses: on the one hand: a feverish desire to be everything and everyone, declaring that 'in every corner of my soul stands an altar to a different god.' The second impulse is toward a state of isolation and a sense of nothingness.

Of the first of these impulses: Campos is possessed of the Whitmanian desire to 'contain multitudes'. Critics have noted how 'Whitman's influence is apparent in part in the sheer vitality of these poems, in the zest for experience which they express.' Indeed Campos has in many respects outdone his precursor in 'containing multitudes': it seems that the entire cosmos is not enough for him to 'contain'. After chanting all the places, all the ports, all the sights he's seen... 'Of all this,' he remarks, 'which is so much, is nothing next to what I want.'

Campos' poems represent the apotheosis of Pessoan anguish. His poems reflect an existentially anguished search for meaning. His poems are at once nostalgic, self-ironic; here despair, terror, the self questioning of the poet are laid bare. The poems as critic remarks, evoke an 'atmosphere of unreality'; this state is created 'by insistence on denial, negativity, absence, loss.'

One of the poet's constant preoccupations is that of identity: he does not know who he is. The problem, it seems, is not that he doesn't know what to be; on the contrary: he wants to be too much, everything; short of achieving this he despairs. Unlike Caeiro, who asks nothing of life, he asks too much. In his poetic meditation 'Tobacco Shop' he asks:

"How should I know what I'll be, I who don't know what I am? 
Be what I think? But I think of being so many things!"

Campos can be manic-depressive, exultant, violent, dynamic; he quests for nowhere and everywhere at once. His is an agonized doubt at the wasting of life—at life, everything. For a critic he is 'par excellence the poet appalled by the emptiness of his own existence, lethargic, lacking in will-power, seeking inspiration, or at all events finding it, in semi-conscious states, in the twilight world between waking and sleeping, in dreams and in drunkenness'.

See also

 Fernando Pessoa
 Heteronym
 Orpheu
 Mário de Sá-Carneiro
 The Book Of Disquiet''
 The Year of the Death of Ricardo Reis
 Portuguese Poetry

References

External links

 
  
 Fernando Pessoa: Collected Poems of Álvaro de Campos, at Shearsman Books
 Álvaro de Campos at MultiPessoa

20th-century Portuguese poets
Portuguese male poets
Portuguese essayists
1890 births
People from Tavira
1935 deaths
Fictional poets
Fernando Pessoa
20th-century essayists